The 2011–12 Primera Divisió was the seventeenth season of top-tier football in Andorra. It began on 18 September 2011 and ended on 22 April 2012. The defending champions FC Santa Coloma placed second, while FC Lusitanos won their first championship.

Stadia and locations

Competition format
The participating teams first played a conventional round-robin schedule with every team playing each opponent once "home" and once "away" (in actuality, the designation of home and away was purely arbitrary as the clubs did not have their own grounds) for a total of 14 games. The league was then split up in two groups of four teams with each of them playing teams within their group in a home-and-away cycle of games. The top four teams competed for the championship. The bottom four clubs played for one direct relegation spot and one relegation play-off spot. Records earned in the First Round were taken over to the respective Second Rounds.

Promotion and relegation from 2010–11
CE Benfica were relegated after last season due to finishing in 8th place. They were replaced by Segona Divisió runners-up FC Rànger's (the champions, Lusitanos B, were promotion ineligible).

Encamp, who finished last season in 7th place, and 3rd place Segona Divisió club Engordany played a two-legged relegation play-off. Engordany won the playoff, 5–1 on aggregate, and won promotion to this competition while Encamp were relegated.

First round

Second round

Championship Round

Relegation Round

Relegation playoffs
The seventh-placed club in the league will compete in a two-legged relegation playoff against the runners-up of the Segona Divisió, for one spot in 2012–13 Primera Divisió.

References

External links
 Official site 

Primera Divisió seasons
Andorra
1